Eswatini Air is an Eswatini-based airline and the flag carrier for the nation. Originally planning to commence operations in June 2022, the airline secured an AOC in December 2022 after some delays. Operations are to commence on 26 March 2023 with Johannesburg twice-daily, with the necessary foreign operator permits expected to be granted by South Africa. Three further destinations are to be added by June 2023.

Destinations 
The airline has confirmed that they will operate to the following destinations, starting with Johannesburg.

Fleet 
, Eswatini Air has acquired the following aircraft:

See also 
 List of airlines of Swaziland

References 

Airlines of Eswatini
Airlines established in 2022